= Ngugu =

Town in Imo State, Nigeria

Coordinates: 5°35′38″N 7°6′43″E

Ngugo is a town in southeastern Nigeria located near the city of Owerri.
